Frome Vale is one of thirty-five city council wards in Bristol, England, lying northeast of the city centre.

It includes the suburbs of Broomhill and Fishponds, and also the Glenside campus of the University of the West of England. The ward is named after the River Frome.

References

Areas of Bristol
Wards of Bristol